Qaleh Now (also Romanized as Qal‘eh Now) is a village in Beyza Rural District, Beyza District, Sepidan County, Fars Province, Iran. At the 2006 census, its population was 475, in 122 families.

References 

Populated places in Beyza County